is a railway station in the city of Minamisōma, Fukushima, Japan, operated by the East Japan Railway Company (JR East).

Lines

Station layout
The station has two opposed side platforms connected to the station building by a footbridge. The station is unattended.

Platforms

History
Kashima Station opened on 3 April 1898. With the privatization of JNR on 1 April 1987, the station came under the operational control of JR East. Due to damage to the line caused by the 2011 Tōhoku earthquake and tsunami, trains from Kashima were able to travel as far as Sōma Station to the north and Haranomachi Station to the south. Services south towards Odaka station resumed in July 2016. Full services to the north resumed in December 2016. Service was extended to  resumed on 1 April 2017. Services between Namie and  remain suspended until at least the year 2020.

Passenger statistics
In fiscal 2015, the station was used by an average of 318 passengers daily (boarding passengers only).

Surrounding area
 Former Kashima Town Hall
 Kashima Post Office

See also
 List of railway stations in Japan

References

External links

  

Railway stations in Fukushima Prefecture
Jōban Line
Railway stations in Japan opened in 1898
Stations of East Japan Railway Company
Minamisōma